Stroke of Fate was an American radio drama, originally aired in 1953.

This NBC Radio alternate history series aired 13 episodes from October 4 to December 27, 1953, featuring actors such as Ed Begley, Alexander Scourby, Hal Studer, and Santos Ortega. The episodes were written by Mort Lewis and George Faulkner, directed by Fred Weihe, and announced by Lionel Ricco. Each 30-minute episode aired Sunday nights at 8 pm ET. Each episode had an alternate history point of divergence and dramatized the results of that change.

All of the episodes have survived.

References 
 Dunning, John (1998). On the Air: The Encyclopedia of Old-Time Radio. Oxford University Press. .

American radio dramas
1950s American radio programs
Alternate history plays
NBC radio programs
1953 radio programme debuts
1953 radio programme endings
American Civil War alternate histories
Anthology radio series
American science fiction radio programs